The Georgia–Alabama League was a minor league baseball league that operated in its two namesake states. The circuit first operated from 1913 to 1917, was revived from 1928 to 1930, then returned to operation for a final time from 1946 through 1951. The league's existence thus spanned some 39 years, but it only fielded teams in 14 seasons. All versions of the Georgia–Alabama League were Class D leagues, the lowest classification in Organized Ball during their years of operation.

Sixteen cities fielded teams in the league at one time or another—nine from Alabama and seven from Georgia. No city was represented in all three of the league's runs. Out of the 14 seasons that the league played, the Georgia teams won eleven titles while the Alabama cities captured only three.  Four Georgia teams won two titles each over the league's three eras: Newnan, Georgia, won the first of their two crowns in 1915, then waited some 34 years to collect the second in 1949; Lindale, Georgia, won in 1929 and 1930; Carrollton, Georgia, picked up two back-to-back titles in 1946 and 1947; and LaGrange, Georgia, took the league's last two championships in 1950 and 1951.

Attendance figures were available for the last run of six years, during which the league drew just shy of 2,000,000 fans to the parks. The turnstile count peaked at about 480,000 in 1947 but by 1951 it had dropped to a little over 175,000, which was insufficient to keep the circuit in operation.

Cities represented
Alexander City, Alabama:  Alexander City Millers 1947–1951
Anniston, Alabama:  Anniston Moulders 1913–1917; Anniston Nobles 1928–1930
Carrollton, Georgia:  Carrollton Frogs 1928; Carrollton Champs 1929–1930; Carrollton Hornets 1946–1950
Cedartown, Georgia:  Cedartown Sea Cows 1928–1929; Cedartown Braves 1930
Gadsden, Alabama:  Gadsden Steel Makers 1913–1914; Gadsden Eagles 1928–1929
Gadsden, Alabama, Alabama City, Alabama & Attalla, Alabama:  Tri-Cities Triplets 1917
Griffin, Georgia:  Griffin Lightfoots 1915–1916; Griffin Griffs 1917; Griffin Pimientos 1947–1949; Griffin Tigers 1950; Griffin Pimientos 1951
Huntsville, Alabama:  Huntsville Springers 1930
LaGrange, Georgia:  LaGrange Terrapins 1913–1915; LaGrange Grangers 1916–1917; LaGrange Troupers 1946–1951
Lindale, Georgia:  Lindale Dragons 1928; Lindale Collegians 1929; Lindale Pepperells 1930
Newnan, Georgia:  Newnan Cowetas 1913–1916; Newnan Brownies 1946–1950
Opelika, Alabama:  Opelika Opelicans 1913; Opelika Pelicans 1914; Opelika Owls 1946–1951
Rome, Georgia & Lindale, Georgia:  Rome Romans 1914–1916; Rome-Lindale Romans 1917; Rome Red Sox 1950–1951
Selma, Alabama:  Selma River Rats 1914
Talladega, Alabama:  Talladega Indians 1913–1914; Talladega Tigers 1915–1917; Talladega Indians 1928–1930 
Tallassee, Alabama: Tallassee Indians 1946–1948; Tallassee Cardinals 1949
Valley, Alabama, Lanett, Alabama & West Point, Georgia:  Valley Rebels 1946–1951

Standings & statistics

1913 to 1917
1913 Georgia–Alabama League
No Playoffs Scheduled

1914 Georgia–Alabama League
Gadsden became a road club August 3.

1915 Georgia–Alabama League
The league disbanded July 14.

1916 Georgia–Alabama League

1917 Georgia–Alabama League
The league disbanded May 23.

1928 to 1930
1928 Georgia–Alabama League
Playoffs: Talladega 2 games, Anniston 1, for the second half title.Finals: Carrollton 4 games, Talladega 2.

1929 Georgia–Alabama League
Playoff: Carrollton 4 games, Lindale 0.

1930 Georgia–Alabama League
Carrollton and Talladega disbanded August 14.Playoff: Cedartown 4 games, Lindale 3, one tie.

1946 to 1951
1946 Georgia–Alabama League
Playoffs: Tallassee 3 games, Carrollton 2; Valley 3 games, Newnan 2;Finals: Tallassee 3 games, Valley 2.

1947 Georgia–Alabama League
Playoff: Valley 3 games, Carrollton 1; Opelika 3 games, Newnan 1;Finals: Valley 3 games, Opelika 2.

1948 Georgia–Alabama League
Playoff: Valley 3 games, Newnan 1; Carrollton 3 games, Alexander City 2 ;Finals: Valley 4 games, Carrollton 0.

1949 Georgia–Alabama League
Playoffs: Newnan 3 games, Tallassee 2;  Alexander City 3 games, LaGrange 1 ;Finals: Alexander City 4 games, Newnan 2.

1950 Georgia–Alabama League
Playoffs: LaGrange 2 games, Carrollton 0;  Alexander City 2 games, Newnan 0 ;Finals: LaGrange 3 games, Alexander City 2.

1951 Georgia–Alabama League
Opelika disbanded July 1; Alexander City disbanded July 15.

League records 1913–1951

Sources
The Encyclopedia of Minor League Baseball: Second Edition via Baseball-Reference.com under GFDL.

Baseball leagues in Georgia (U.S. state)
Baseball leagues in Alabama
Defunct minor baseball leagues in the United States
Sports leagues established in 1913
Sports leagues established in 1951